Sandusky is a surname. Notable people with the surname include:

Alex Sandusky, former National Football League player
Gerry Sandusky, sportscaster, son of John Sandusky
Jerry Sandusky, convicted child molester and former college football coach
Jim Sandusky, former Canadian Football League player
John Sandusky, former National Football League player and coach
Jon Sandusky, former college football player, son of Jerry Sandusky
Mike Sandusky, former National Football League player

See also
Sandusky (disambiguation)